Muhammad Syafiq bin Puteh (born 20 October 1995) is a Malaysian diver.  He competes in 1m springboard, 3m springboard, mixed synchronized diving 3m and synchronized diving 3m.

References 

1995 births
Living people
People from Perak
Malaysian people of Malay descent
Malaysian Muslims
Malaysian male divers
Commonwealth Games medallists in diving
Southeast Asian Games medalists in diving
Competitors at the 2021 Southeast Asian Games
Southeast Asian Games gold medalists for Malaysia
Divers at the 2022 Commonwealth Games
Commonwealth Games silver medallists for Malaysia
Commonwealth Games bronze medallists for Malaysia
21st-century Malaysian people
Divers at the 2018 Asian Games
Medallists at the 2022 Commonwealth Games